The 1967 Boston College Eagles baseball team represented Boston College in the 1967 NCAA University Division baseball season. The Eagles played their home games at Cleveland Circle Field. The team was coached by Eddie Pellagrini in his 10th year at Boston College.

The Eagles won the District I Playoff to advanced to the College World Series, where they were defeated by the Houston Cougars.

The team typically played at John Shea Field, but with the diamond sinking over the course of time, they were forced to play at Cleveland Circle Field.

Roster

Schedule 

! style="" | Regular Season
|- valign="top" 

|- align="center" bgcolor="#ccffcc"
| 1 || April 4 || vs  || Unknown • Cambridge, Massachusetts || 17–0 || 1–0 || 1–0
|- align="center" bgcolor="#fffdd0"
| 2 || April 11 ||  || Cleveland Circle Field • Boston, Massachusetts || 2–2 || 1–0–1 || 1–0
|- align="center" bgcolor="#ccffcc"
| 3 || April  ||  || Cleveland Circle Field • Boston, Massachusetts || 2–1 || 2–0–1 || 2–0
|- align="center" bgcolor="#ccffcc"
| 4 || April 21 || at  || Unknown • Medford, Massachusetts || 6–0 || 3–0–1 || 3–0
|- align="center" bgcolor="#ffcccc"
| 5 || April 24 || at  || Parsons Field • Brookline, Massachusetts || 3–6 || 3–1–1 || 3–1
|- align="center" bgcolor="#ccffcc"
| 6 || April 26 ||  || Cleveland Circle Field • Boston, Massachusetts || 9–1 || 4–1–1 || 4–1
|- align="center" bgcolor="#ccffcc"
| 7 || April 27 || Tufts || Cleveland Circle Field • Boston, Massachusetts || 8–3 || 5–1–1 || 5–1
|-

|- align="center" bgcolor="#fffdd0"
| 8 || May 1 || at Boston University || Unknown • Boston, Massachusetts || 3–3 || 5–1–2 || 5–1–1
|- align="center" bgcolor="#ccffcc"
| 9 || May  || vs  || Unknown • Unknown || 6–1 || 6–1–2 || 5–1–1
|- align="center" bgcolor="#ffcccc"
| 10 || May 3 || at  || Red Rolfe Field • Hanover, New Hampshire || 8–9 || 6–2–2 || 5–1–1
|- align="center" bgcolor="#ffcccc"
| 11 || May 6 ||  || Cleveland Circle Field • Boston, Massachusetts || 3–5 || 6–3–2 || 5–2–1
|- align="center" bgcolor="#fffdd0"
| 12 || May  ||  || Unknown • Unknown || 0–0 || 6–3–3 || 5–2–1
|- align="center" bgcolor="#ccffcc"
| 13 || May 11 || Northeastern || Cleveland Circle Field • Boston, Massachusetts || 7–4 || 7–3–3 || 6–2–1
|- align="center" bgcolor="#ccffcc"
| 14 || May  ||  || Unknown • Unknown || 6–5 || 8–3–3 || 6–2–1
|-

|-
|-
! style="" | Postseason
|- valign="top"

|- align="center" bgcolor="#ccffcc"
| 15 || May 28 || vs Dartmouth || Unknown • Amherst, Massachusetts || 4–3 || 9–3–3 || 6–2–1
|- align="center" bgcolor="#ffcccc"
| 16 || May 28 || vs Dartmouth || Unknown • Amherst, Massachusetts || 8–9 || 9–4–3 || 6–2–1
|- align="center" bgcolor="#ccffcc"
| 17 || May 29 || vs Dartmouth || Unknown • Amherst, Massachusetts || 15–13 || 10–4–3 || 6–2–1
|- align="center" bgcolor="#ccffcc"
| 18 || June 2 || at  || Unknown • Amherst, Massachusetts || 4–1 || 11–4–3 || 6–2–1
|- align="center" bgcolor="#ffcccc"
| 19 || June 2 || at Massachusetts || Unknown • Amherst, Massachusetts || 5–6 || 11–5–3 || 6–2–1
|- align="center" bgcolor="#ccffcc"
| 20 || June 3 || at Massachusetts || Unknown • Amherst, Massachusetts || 7–6 || 12–5–3 || 6–2–1
|-

|- align="center" bgcolor="#ccffcc"
| 21 || June 1 ||  || Unknown • Unknown || 2–1 || 13–5–3 || 6–2–1
|-

|- align="center" bgcolor="#ccffcc"
| 22 || June 12 || vs  || Omaha Municipal Stadium • Omaha, Nebraska || 3–1 || 14–5–3 || 6–2–1
|- align="center" bgcolor="#ffcccc"
| 23 || June 14 || vs Arizona State || Omaha Municipal Stadium • Omaha, Nebraska || 1–8 || 14–6–3 || 6–2–1
|- align="center" bgcolor="#ffcccc"
| 24 || June 15 || vs Houston || Omaha Municipal Stadium • Omaha, Nebraska || 2–3 || 14–7–3 || 6–2–1
|-

|-
|

References 

Boston College Eagles baseball seasons
Boston College Eagles baseball
College World Series seasons
Boston College
1960s in Boston